Right Reverend Emmanuel Thomas Savundaranayagam (born 13 July 1938) is a Sri Lankan Tamil priest and former Roman Catholic Bishop of Jaffna.

Early life and family
Savundaranayagam was born on 13 July 1938 in Kayts on the island of Velanaitivu in northern Ceylon. He was educated at St. Anthony's College, Kayts and St. Patrick's College, Jaffna. He then studied at St. Martin's Seminary, Jaffna and National Seminary, Ampitiya (1957–64). Savundaranayagam has a Doctor of Sacred Theology degree from the Pontifical Urbaniana University and a Diploma in Catechetics.

Career
Savundaranayagam was ordained as a priest in December 1963. After his ordination he served as an assistant parish priest at St. Mary's Cathedral, Jaffna for few years. In January 1981 he was appointed Bishop of Mannar and was ordained as a bishop in July 1981 at the Shrine of Our Lady of Madhu. He became Bishop of Jaffna in July 1992. He retired in October 2015.

Savundaranayagam is a strong activist for Tamil rights in Sri Lanka and humanitarian efforts in what is sometimes called "Tamil Eelam". He had called for international intervention to stop the Sri Lankan conflict.

References

External links

 

1938 births
20th-century Roman Catholic bishops in Sri Lanka
Alumni of St. Patrick's College, Jaffna
Roman Catholic bishops of Jaffna
Living people
People from Northern Province, Sri Lanka
People from British Ceylon
Pontifical Urban University alumni
Roman Catholic bishops of Mannar
Sri Lankan Tamil activists
Sri Lankan Tamil priests